The Hindi blogosphere is the online community of Hindi-language weblogs that are a part of the larger Indian blogosphere.

History
Alok Kumar is known as the first Hindi blogger. His blog नौ दौ ग्यारह (9-2-11) was the first known Hindi blog. He coined the term Chittha (Hindi:चिट्ठा) for blog which was quickly adopted by other bloggers and later became the standard Hindi term for it. Because of the difficulties involved in typing Hindi script, very few people used it online, but later on, due to the availability of Hindi typing tools, the number of Hindi bloggers began growing.

In 2007, the number of Hindi blogs increased rapidly. This was due to the advent of Indic Unicode support in various blogging services, and the advent of new Hindi typing tools like Google Indic Transliteration tool in Blogger and the promotion of Hindi blogging in the mainstream media.

Women in Hindi blogging
Some of the most popular Hindi bloggers are women. In April 2013, there were more than 50,000 Hindi blogs, one fourth of which were written by female bloggers.

Types of blogs
During the beginning days, most Hindi blogs were personal, and there were few topic focused blogs. During 2007, the number of Hindi blogs increased rapidly and blogs focused on various topics like cinema, technology, science, hobbies, photoblog began.

Blog literary award

The Parikalpna Award is a literary award for blogs in India. It is presented by the magazine Parikalpnaa Samay and the company Parikalpnaa.

Events

First International Hindi Bloggers Conference was inaugurated by the Chief Minister of Uttarakhand Mr. Ramesh Pokhariyal Nishank in New Delhi at 30 April 2011. This One day celebration session was chaired by Ashok Chakradhar, Dr. Ram Darash Mishra, Prabhakar Shrotriy, Ravindra Prabhat and Vishwa Bandhu Gupta.
Second Hindi Bloggers Conference was inaugurated by the Senior Indian Journalist Mr Mudra Rakshas in Lucknow at 27 August 2012.This One day celebration session was chaired by Shailendra Sagar, Birendra Yadav, Udbhrant, Rakesh Veda, Sudhakar Adeeb, Ravindra Prabhat and Dr. Subhaash Ray.
Third International Bloggers Conference was inaugurated by the Senior leader of Nepali Congress Party and Ex- cabinet minister of Nepal Mr.Arjun Narasingha K.C. in Kathmandu, Nepal started at 13 September 2013 that concluded at 15 September 2013. South Asian Bloggers and literary persons participated in Kathmandu. Parallel online contributions were made by the other participants. This three days celebration session was chaired by Mr. Kumud Adhikari, Suman Pokhrel, Uma Suvedi, Sanat Regmi, Vikram Mani Tripathi, Ravindra Prabhat, Dr. Rama Dwivedi, Dr. Sampatdevi Muraraka, K.K. Yadav, Akanksha Yadav, Girish Pankaj, Lalit Sharma, B.S. Pawala, Dr Ram Bahadur Mishra, Shailesh Bharatvasi, Mukesh Kumar Sinha, Mukesh Tiwari, Manoj Bhavuk, Saroj Suman, Vinay Prajapati, Sunita Prem Yadav etc. Nepali, Hindi, Bhojpuri, Awadhi, Maithili, Chhattisgarhi writer and folklore scholar.
Fourth International Bloggers Conference was inaugurated by the Secretary General Bhutan Chamber of Commerce and Industry Mr. Fub shring in Thimpu, Bhutan started at 16 January 2015 that concluded at 18 January 2015. This three days celebration session was chaired by Deputy Secretary General of Bhutan Chamber of Commerce and Industry Mr.Chandra Kshetri, Chairperson of Women's Wing of SAARC Committee and the International School of Bhutan Mrs. Thinley Lham, chairman of linguistics department Assam University in Silchar Professor Mr.Nityanand Pandey, Director Indian postal services Allahabad region Mr. Krishna Kumar Yadav and Senior Hindi satirist Mr. Girish Pankaj. 
Fifth International Bloggers Conference was inaugurated by the Senior Dramatist in Sri Lanka Mr. Somrathne Withana and Ex Cabinet Minister of Uttar Pradesh Govt. Mr. Nakul Dubey in Sri Lanka's capital Colombo and cultural capital Kandy from 23 to 27 May 2015. This three days celebration session was chaired by Director Postal Service, Rajasthan west Region, Jodhpur, Mr. Krishna Kumar Yadav, Head of Deptt. Hindi Department and Uttar Maharashtra University Jalgaon, Mr. Sunil Kulkarni and Chief Editor of Parikalpana Samay and organizer of 'International Bloggers Conference’Senior Hindi satirist Mr. Ravindra Prabhat.

See also
Blogosphere
Indic computing

References

External links

Hindi
Indic computing
Blogospheres
Internet terminology